Daniel Fathers (born 23 March 1966) is an English actor. In 2018, Fathers joined the cast of Snatch (Sony Pictures Television) as a series regular (Season 2), starring opposite Rupert Grint, as the American Gangster Clarence Perry. Shot in Málaga, Spain, it was to be released in September 2018.

Filmography

Film

Television

Video games

External links 
 

English male film actors
English male television actors
Living people
1966 births